Brancuporus is a genus of predaceous diving beetles in the family Dytiscidae. There are at least two described species in Brancuporus. They are found in Australasia.

Species
These two species belong to the genus Brancuporus:
 Brancuporus gottwaldi (Hendrich, 2001)
 Brancuporus pennifoldae (Watts & Pinder, 2000)

References

Further reading

 
 
 

Dytiscidae